Humao is a type of brim hat which was used in the Tang dynasty by both Chinese men and women when horse-riding. Women of all social ranks (ranging from palace ladies to commoners) wore humao when horse-riding since the beginning of the Kaiyuan period (713–741 AD), during the Mid-Tang dynasty. The humao was a type of veil-less hat (which contrasted to the weimao); therefore, it allowed for the faces and hair to be exposed.

Gallery

Similar items 
 Damao (hat)
 Gat
 Weimao

See also 

 Hanfu
 Hufu
 Hanfu headgear
 List of hats and headgear
 Liangmao
 Mili (veil)

References 

Chinese traditional clothing
Chinese headgear